Sport Lisboa e Nelas is a Portuguese football club located in the village of Nelas, Viseu. The club was founded on 25 August 1939. It is a branch club of both Benfica and Sporting CP. Nelas play at the Estádio Municipal de Nelas which holds a capacity of 7,500. The currently play in the AF Viseu South Division. The club's most recent season saw them finish fifth in the AF Viseu South Division.

References

External links
Official site
ZeroZero profile
ForaDeJogo.net profile

Football clubs in Portugal
Association football clubs established in 1939
1939 establishments in Portugal